IRIB TV5 (شبکه پنج, Shibkâh-e Panj in Persian), is an Islamic Republic of Iran Broadcasting television channel.

The channel is one of the newer television channels in Iran and was established on November 26, 1995. The channel was also referred to as Tehran Channel by the citizens of Tehran, as it was only available in Tehran.
On 20 December 2014, the channel changed from a provincial to a national channel, adding programs focusing on the economy. Tehran's provincial channel started broadcasting on 25 January 2016, in its own right but merged again with Channel 5 on 10 August 2016 and Channel 5 became provincial again.

Popular programs
 Be Khane Barmigardim
 Dorane Sarkeshi (2003)
 Pavarchin (2002–03)
 Rangin Kaman
 Shabhaye Tehran
 Oboore Shishei (2006)
 Shabe Shishei (2007)
 My Plus
 Mosalase Shishei (2008)
 Tehran 20
 Baraye Akharin Bar
 Thank You (2008)
 Alarm for Cobra 11 - The Motorway Police
 White Tower (2009)
 Robin Hood (2007, 2009)
 Jashne Ramezan
 Mosabeghe Bozorg
 Dani va Man
 Roozegare Javani
 Hotel (Iranian TV Series)
 Khodroe Tehran 11
 How It's Made
 Yi San (2014)

See also

 Mazandaran TV

References

External links

IRIB TV5 Live streaming

Television stations in Iran
Persian-language television stations
Islamic Republic of Iran Broadcasting
Television channels and stations established in 1994
Mass media in Tehran
1994 establishments in Iran